A Snowy Day in Oakland (formerly titled HeadShop) is a 2023 American comedy film written and directed by Kim Bass and starring Nicole Ari Parker.

Plot
A Snowy Day in Oakland - A magical urban tale about a beautiful psychologist from San Francisco who decides to end a stalled romance with her longtime, high-profile, psychiatrist, boyfriend/business partner. She moves on with her life by opening her own private practice in a vacant, street-front office space in the middle of a small, commercial block located across the bay in Oakland, turning the predominately African-American and psychologically ignored neighborhood on its emotional ear.

Cast
Nicole Ari Parker as Dr. Latrice Monroe
Evan Ross as Rodney Smalls
Arden Myrin as Shelby Hockman
Roger Cross as Brother Freeman
Sean Maguire as Grant
Loretta Devine as Jeanette
Reno Wilson as Marquis King
Kimberly Elise as Theona
Deon Cole as Davis
Michael Jai White as Reverend Carter
Marla Gibbs as Mrs. Keys
Tony Plana as Jesus Salgado
Donis Leonard Jr. as Glock 9
Claudia Zevallos as Angelica
Keith David as Mr. Monroe
Jackée Harry as Mrs. Monroe

Production
Principal photography occurred in Los Angeles in July 2017.  Filming also occurred in San Francisco in August 2017.

Kris Marshall was originally cast in the film.  However, Sean Maguire replaced him after Marshall was forced to pull out of the film due to an ankle injury.

As of 2022, the film is in post-production.

Release
The film was originally scheduled to be released in theaters on January 13, 2023. The release date was then moved to March 17, 2023.

References

External links
 

Upcoming films
Films shot in Los Angeles
Films shot in San Francisco
American comedy films
2020s English-language films
2020s American films